The Thracian question is the question of the territory, population and historical heritage of Thrace. The Thracian question is part of the Eastern Question.

History 
The Thracian question is an integral part of the Bulgarian national question and is a conditional indication of the struggle of the Bulgarians from Thrace to liberate them from Ottoman domination. The successful completion of the Eastern Rumelia Union with the Principality of Bulgaria in 1885 gave the struggling Thracians the hope that they would be able to achieve their liberation. They took an active part in the Ilinden–Preobrazhenie Uprising in 1903.

References 

 Любомир Милетич Разорението на тракийските българи през 1913 г.  София,1989

19th century in the Ottoman Empire
History of Thrace
20th century in the Ottoman Empire